Benedict is a village in York County, Nebraska, United States. The population was 234 at the 2010 census.

History
Benedict was platted in 1886 when the Kansas City and Omaha Railroad was extended to that point. It was named for E. C. Benedict, a railroad official.  Benedict was incorporated as a village in 1890.

Geography
Benedict is located at  (41.006177, -97.606689).

Demographics

2010 census
As of the census of 2010, there were 234 people, 87 households, and 67 families residing in the village. The racial makeup of the village was 98.7% White, 0.4% African American, 0.4% Native American, and 0.4% from two or more races. Hispanic or Latino of any race were 0.4% of the population.

There were 87 households, of which 34.5% had children under the age of 18 living with them, 67.8% were married couples living together, 8.0% had a female householder with no husband present, 1.1% had a male householder with no wife present, and 23.0% were non-families. 16.1% of all households were made up of individuals, and 6.9% had someone living alone who was 65 years of age or older. The average household size was 2.69 and the average family size was 3.01.

The median age in the village was 40.2 years. 23.5% of residents were under the age of 18; 9.8% were between the ages of 18 and 24; 21.9% were from 25 to 44; 30.8% were from 45 to 64; and 14.1% were 65 years of age or older. The gender makeup of the village was 48.7% male and 51.3% female.

2000 census
As of the census of 2000, there were 278 people, 96 households, and 72 families residing in the village. The population density was 1,465.4 people per square mile (564.9/km2). There were 102 housing units at an average density of 537.7 per square mile (207.3/km2). The racial makeup of the village was 93.88% White, 3.96% African American and 2.16% Native American.

There were 96 households, out of which 42.7% had children under the age of 18 living with them, 63.5% were married couples living together, 6.3% had a female householder with no husband present, and 25.0% were non-families. 21.9% of all households were made up of individuals, and 11.5% had someone living alone who was 65 years of age or older. The average household size was 2.90 and the average family size was 3.42.

In the village, the population was spread out, with 35.3% under the age of 18, 5.4% from 18 to 24, 30.9% from 25 to 44, 17.3% from 45 to 64, and 11.2% who were 65 years of age or older. The median age was 34 years. For every 100 females, there were 102.9 males. For every 100 females age 18 and over, there were 106.9 males.

As of 2000 the median income for a household in the village was $38,125, and the median income for a family was $41,250. Males had a median income of $28,438 versus $19,844 for females. The per capita income for the village was $12,248. About 1.3% of families and 2.8% of the population were below the poverty line, including 2.5% of those under the age of eighteen and 11.1% of those 65 or over.

References

Villages in Nebraska
Villages in York County, Nebraska